Debendra Ghosh (19th century C.E.) was a prominent 19th century Bengali writer. He was a major figure in the Vangiya Sahitya Parishad .

External links
 

Ghosh, Debendra Prasad
Ghosh, Debendra Prasad
Year of death unknown
Year of birth unknown